Archeterokrohnia is a genus of chaetognaths in the family Heterokrohniidae.The total body length excluding tail fin 28.5; the tail section is 55.2% of the tail fin; head blunt when hooded, triangular after preservation, head with 3.5 mm. Furthermore, the eyes are absent, the trunk section is orange throughout in life, and the organism exists around 3200 m below sea level.

Species
Archeterokrohnia docrickettsae Thuesen & Haddock, 2013
Archeterokrohnia longicaudata (Hagen & Kapp, 1986)
Archeterokrohnia palpifera Casanova, 1986
Archeterokrohnia rubra Casanova, 1986

References

Thuesen, Erik V., and Steven H.d. Haddock. “Archeterokrohnia Docrickettsae (Chaetognatha: Phragmophora: Heterokrohniidae), a New Species of Deep-Sea Arrow Worm from the Gulf of California.” Zootaxa, 2013 Magnolia Press, www.mapress.com/j/zt/article/view/zootaxa.3717.3.2/32220.

Chaetognatha
Protostome genera